March On For Voting Rights was a mass mobilization organized by civil rights leaders in response to Senate Republicans blocking the For The People Act. On August 28, the 58th anniversary of Martin Luther King Jr.'s historic March on Washington, activists marched on cities across America to demand that the vision of MLK's "I Have a Dream" speech be deferred no longer.

For the People Act 
The announcement of the march came one day after Senate Republicans blocked the For the People Act – a signature voting and election bill that Democrats had pitched to counter state-level efforts. Republicans had expressed widespread opposition to the measure, arguing that they felt it was designed to help Democrats succeed in future elections.

Organizers 
Martin Luther King III, the eldest son of Martin Luther King Jr., lead the march with his family’s organization the Drum Major Institute along with March On, Service Employees International Union, Future Coalition, and Al Sharpton lead with his organization, National Action Network.

March On said the need to pass federal voting rights protections has increase dramatically since the Jan. 6 riot at the U.S. Capitol, when supporters of former President Trump stormed the building on the baseless premise that the 2020 presidential election was stolen.“The danger since then has only increased, as numerous elected officials have now codified such lies into law, citing nonexistent voter fraud and public doubts they themselves encouraged,” March On said.MLK III said his father would be both saddened and elated in 2021.“I think my father would be greatly disappointed in where we are at this moment, but he’d be quite proud of the young people that came together last year. He’d be proud of the fact that millions of young people in our nation actually sparked movements around the world, because George Floyd did not just impact the United States,” King said.Alejandro Chavez, the child of the oldest of the late labor leader Cesar Chavez's eight children, an activist working in grassroots organizing, Latino outreach and movement-building, was also a leader in the march.

Marches 
The Aug. 28 march marked the 58th anniversary of the historic March on Washington where Martin Luther King Jr. delivered his “I Have a Dream” speech. Marches were held in Washington DC, Atlanta, Miami, Phoenix and Houston. The rallies, which were held in dozens of cities, were intended to increase pressure on Democrats to rewrite procedural rules that would allow Democrats to muscle the legislation through without Republican votes.

Those attending the march in Washington gathered at McPherson Square at 8 a.m. before starting the march at 9:45 a.m., according to organizers. The group marched past Black Lives Matter Plaza, the White House and the Washington Monument before rallying from 11:30 a.m. to 3 p.m. near the National Museum of African American History and Culture at 15th Street and Constitution Avenue NW.

DC 
Thousands of people marched in DC Civil rights leaders joined by about 70 D.C. statehood activists at Freedom Plaza in Northwest to insist making the District the 51st state is a priority for the national voting rights movement.

Atlanta 
Hundreds of people marched in Atlanta to support federal voting rights legislation. Outside the King Center, supporters called on Congress to pass the John Lewis Voting Rights Advancement Act — named for the Atlanta civil rights leader and congressman who died last year. Later, they marched past Ebenezer Baptist Church to the John Lewis mural on Auburn Avenue to honor the bill’s namesake.

Florida 
Hundreds of people marched in Florida in Miami and West Palm Beach.

Arizona 
Hundreds of Arizonans gathered in Phoenix for the march. The event was held indoors at Pilgrim's Rest Baptist Church in lieu of an outdoor march due to Phoenix's extreme August heat, according to event organizers. Attendees listened in on a church service with modifications to fit the event, such as speeches about voting that then transitioned to panels with community leaders.

References 

Election and voting-related organizations based in the United States
Political advocacy groups in the United States
Organizations established in 2020
Voter turnout organizations
August 2021 events in the United States